Amalapuram Lok Sabha constituency is one of the twenty-five lok sabha constituencies of Andhra Pradesh in India. It comprises seven assembly segments and belongs to Konaseema district.

Assembly segments 
As per the Delimitation of Parliamentary and Assembly constituencies order (2008), the constituency covers seven assembly segments:

Members of Parliament 

^ by poll

Election results

Genenral Election 1989

Genenral Election 1991

Genenral Election 1996

Genenral Election 1998

Genenral Election 1999

Genenral Election 2004

Genenral Election 2009

Genenral Election 2014

Genenral Election 2019

See also 
 List of constituencies of the Andhra Pradesh Legislative Assembly

References

External links 
 Amalapuram lok sabha constituency election 2019 date and schedule

East Godavari district
Lok Sabha constituencies in Andhra Pradesh